Ivanantonia is the only genus in the extinct rodent family Ivanantoniidae and is represented by a single species, Ivanantonia efremovi, from the early Eocene of Mongolia. Ivanantonia is poorly known, with only the lower dentition represented. The genus is unusual among early rodents in lacking all lower premolars and in showing evidence of propalinal chewing (Hartenberger et al., 1997).  The relationships of Ivanantonia are unclear. It was described as a ctenodactyloid (Shevyreva, 1989). Hartenberger et al. (1997) suggested a potential relationship to the muroid Nonomys but declined to assign Ivanantoniidae to a suborder within Rodentia.

References

Shevyreva, N.S. 2007. 1989. New rodents (Ctenodactyloidea, Rodentia, Mammalia) from the Lower Eocene of Mongolia. Paleontological Journal, 3: 60–72.

Eocene rodents
Fossils of Mongolia
Fossil taxa described in 1989